Cambridgeshire County Council is elected every four years using the first past the post system of election. As of 2021 the council consists of 61 council seats, representing 60 electoral divisions. The Conservative Party is currently the largest party bloc on the council.

Under the Local Government Act 1972 the non-metropolitan county of Cambridgeshire was created from the merger of the administrative counties of Cambridgeshire and Isle of Ely and Huntingdon and Peterborough, both of which were formed in 1965. The first elections to the new authority were in April 1973, and the council took office on 1 April 1974.

From its creation until 1998, the county council administered the entire area of the ceremonial county of Cambridgeshire. Peterborough City Council became a unitary authority in 1998, but continues to form part of the county for ceremonial purposes.

Political control

Since 1973 political control of the council has been held by the following parties:

Leadership
The leaders of the council since 1997 have been:

County council composition

Composition since 1973

County result maps

By-election results
The following is an incomplete list of by-elections to Cambridgeshire County Council.

1973-1976

1993−1997

1997−2001

2001−2005

2005−2009

2009-2013

By-election called following the death of Leslie Sims.

By-election called following the resignation of Siep Wijsenbeek.

By-election following death of John West

2013−2017

By-election following resignation of Ray Manning on 2 April 2014.

By-election held following the death of John Reynolds.

By-election following resignation of Martin Curtis on 22 March 2015.

The by-election was triggered by the resignation of Councillor Peter Lagoda, who was elected for the UK Independence Party, following his conviction for benefit fraud.

By-election following the resignation of Killian Bourke on 11 May 2015.

By-election following the death of Sandra Rylance.

The by-election was triggered by the death of Councillor Phil Read, who was elected as a Conservative.

By-election following the death of Councillor Steven Van de Kerkhove in January 2016. 2-member division.

2017−2021

See also
 Cambridge local elections
 East Cambridgeshire local elections
 Fenland local elections
 Huntingdonshire local elections
 Peterborough local government
 South Cambridgeshire local elections

References

External links
 Cambridgeshire County Council
 Local Government Commission for England

 
County council elections in England
Council elections in Cambridgeshire